Cryptandra glabriflora is a flowering plant in the family Rhamnaceae and is endemic to Kalbarri National Park in Western Australia. It is a low shrub with linear or oblong leaves and clusters of white or pink, tube-shaped flowers.

Description
The flowers are white or pink, sessile, clustered along the branches and more or less glabrous. Flowering occurs from May to August.

Taxonomy and naming
Cryptandra glabriflora was first formally described in 1863 by George Bentham in Flora Australiensis from specimens collected near the Murchison River by Augustus Oldfield. The specific epithet (glabriflora ) means "glabrous-flowered".

Distribution and habitat
This cryptandra is only known from Kalbarri National Park where it grows on plains in sand or gravelly soils.

Conservation status
This cryptandra is listed as "Priority Two" by the Western Australian Government Department of Biodiversity, Conservation and Attractions, meaning that it is poorly known and from only one or a few locations.

References

glabriflora
Rosales of Australia
Flora of Western Australia
Plants described in 1863
Taxa named by George Bentham